Mościska may refer to:
Polish name of Mostyska in Ukraine
Mościska, district of the town of Orzesze in south Poland
Mościska, Chełm County in Lublin Voivodeship (east Poland)
Mościska, Parczew County in Lublin Voivodeship (east Poland)
Mościska, Radzyń Podlaski County in Lublin Voivodeship (east Poland)
Mościska, Łódź Voivodeship (central Poland)
Mościska, Garwolin County in Masovian Voivodeship (east-central Poland)
Mościska, Gostynin County in Masovian Voivodeship (east-central Poland)
Mościska, Grodzisk Mazowiecki County in Masovian Voivodeship (east-central Poland)
Mościska, Sierpc County in Masovian Voivodeship (east-central Poland)
Mościska, Warsaw West County in Masovian Voivodeship (east-central Poland)
Mościska, Wyszków County in Masovian Voivodeship (east-central Poland)
Mościska, Pomeranian Voivodeship (north Poland)
Mościska, Greater Poland Voivodeship (west-central Poland)
Mościska, Gmina Skrwilno in Kuyavian-Pomeranian Voivodeship (north-central Poland)
Mościska, Gmina Brzuze in Kuyavian-Pomeranian Voivodeship (north-central Poland)
Mościska, Krasnystaw County in Lublin Voivodeship (east Poland)
Mościska, Podlaskie Voivodeship (north-east Poland)

See also: Mościska Duże, Mościska Małe, Mościska-Kolonia